MiniPanzer and MegaPanzer are two variants of  Bundestrojaner (German for federal Trojan horse) written for ERA IT Solutions (a Swiss federal government contractor) by software engineer Ruben Unteregger, and later used by Switzerland's Federal Department of Environment, Transport, Energy and Communications (UVEK) to intercept Skype and more generally voice over IP traffic on Windows XP systems.

The source code of the program was released under the GNU General Public License version 3 (GPLv3) in 2009 by their author, who retained the copyright. Thereafter, the trojan was apparently detected in the wild. One of its designations given by anti-virus companies was Trojan.Peskyspy.

The malware used DLL injection.

References

Further reading
 Bundestrojaner: A programmer speaks out Interview with the author on gulli.com

External links
 MiniPanzer SourceForge, source code
 MegaPanzer SourceForge source code

Computer surveillance
Federal Department of Environment, Transport, Energy and Communications
Trojan horses
Windows trojans
Windows malware
Malware toolkits
Free software
Spyware used by governments